Delovoy Tsentr is a station on Bolshaya Koltsevaya line of the Moscow Metro. The station opened on 26 February 2018 as one of five initial stations on the new line.

Delovoy Tsentr is the terminus for a spur off the main line that includes Shelepikha Station. A future line, the Rublyovo–Arkhangelskaya line, which the city plans to develop in 2027, will ultimately incorporate these stations.

The station is within the Moscow International Business Center and takes its name from the complex.

Transfer

References

Moscow Metro stations
Railway stations in Russia opened in 2018
Bolshaya Koltsevaya line